Extant is the opposite of the word extinct. It may refer to:

 Extant hereditary titles
 Extant literature, surviving literature, such as Beowulf, the oldest extant manuscript written in English
 Extant taxon, a taxon which is not extinct, such as an extant species
 Extant Theatre Company, a disability arts organisation
 Extant (TV series), an American television series
 Hank Hall, also known as Extant, a DC Comics supervillain

See also
 Extent (disambiguation)